Preston Public School is a school district in Preston, unincorporated Okmulgee County, Oklahoma. It includes an elementary/junior high school campus and a Preston High School campus.

References

External links
 Preston Public School
 

School districts in Oklahoma
Education in Okmulgee County, Oklahoma